Rhyzodiastes parumcostatus is a species of ground beetle in the subfamily Rhysodinae. It was described by Léon Fairmaire in 1868. It is found in Brazil and northern Argentina.

References

Rhyzodiastes
Beetles of South America
Beetles described in 1868
Taxa named by Léon Fairmaire